Donald Hyatt may refer to:

 Donald M. Hyatt, mayor of Newport News, VIrginia
Donald Hyatt, character in Alice Doesn't Live Here Anymore and Alice (TV series)